Artur Fernandes Agostinho (25 December 1920 – 22 March 2011) was a Portuguese journalist, recipient of the Military Order of Saint James of the Sword (Ordem Militar de Sant'Iago da Espada).

References 

Portuguese journalists
Male journalists
1920 births
2011 deaths
People from Lisbon